Local elections were held in Denmark on 17 November 2009. Councils were elected in Denmark's 98 municipalities and the five regions. 2468 seats were contested in the municipal elections (previous election: 2522 seats). 205 seats were contested in the regional elections.

Legal basis
The electoral details are laid down in the municipal and regional electoral act. The elections are overseen by the Ministry of the Interior.

Results

Results of regional elections
The Ministry of interior informed that voter turnout was 65.7%. The regions are not municipalities, and are not allowed to levy any taxes, but are financed only through block grants from the central government and the municipalities within each region.
The results of the regional elections:

Number of councillors and political parties in the regional councils

Results of municipal elections
The Ministry of the Interior stated that voter turnout was 65.8%.
The results of the municipal elections:

Number of councillors and political parties in the municipal councils

Mayors in the municipalities
The mayors of the 98 municipalities heads the council meetings and is the chairman of the finance committee in each of their respective municipalities. Only in Copenhagen, this mayor – the head of the finance committee and council meetings – is called the lord mayor.

Old and new mayors in the municipalities
The term of office for the mayors elected by the majority of councillors among its members in each municipal council is the same as for the councils elected. The correct name for the municipality on the somewhat remote island of Bornholm is regional municipality, because the municipality also handles several tasks not carried out by the other Danish municipalities but by the regions.

References 

2009
Local elections
Danish local elections